Tara Emad  (born 11 May 1993) Egyptian model and actress.

Career
Emad was born in Cairo, Egypt, to an Egyptian father and Montenegrin mother. Around the age of only 14, she had her first photo shoot with the MENA magazine Layalina, this also lead to her first runway show. Emad participated in Miss Teen Egypt and won the award in 2010. As a result, she entered the Miss Global Teen pageant in the same year in Brasil; Emad was the 1st runner-up and given the title of Teen Queen of Africa. She is studying at the German University in Cairo- Applied Arts & Science. She previously attended school at Port Said Language School in Zamalek, Egypt.

She started acting when she was 15 years old:

Film:
 2016 - Main woman role: “The 4th Pyramid” 
Directed by: Peter Mimi
 2016 - Main role: “The Eve’s Apple” 
Directed by: Tamer Sami
 2017 - Main woman role: “The unknown sweet potato seller” 
Directed by: Ahmed Roshdy
2017 - “Voice note” 
Directed by Ashraf Hamdy
 2017 - Role in “Kheir wa Baraka” 
Directed by: Sameh Abdel Aziz
 2018 - Main role: “Khouroug El Nass” 
Directed by: Hassan El Sayed 
 2018 – Role in “122” 
Directed by: Yasser El Yasry
 2018 – Role in “Torab El Mass” 
Directed by: Marwan Hamed
 2018 – Role in “El Kowayeseen” 
Directed by: Ahmed El Gendy

TV Series: 
 2009 – Role in “Al Jamaa" ("The University") 
Directed by: Hani Khalifa & Amr Koura
 2011 - "Queen of the kitchen" TV program 
Directed by: Sameh Zein
 2012 - Role in first Egyptian TV Soap-Opera "Zay el Ward" 
Directed by: Saad Hindawy
 2014 - Main woman role in – “Saheb al Sa’ada” 
Directed by: Ramy Imam
 2014 - One of three main woman roles in “ Circle of Love” – Filmed in Jordan and UAE. 
Directed by: Eyad El Khzouz
 2014 - Presenter in “ Leilit Ounce” 13 episodes about Arab musical legends filmed in Lebanon
 2015 - Role in “ Bein El Sarayat” 
Directed by: Sameh Abdelaziz
 2015 - Role in “El Salook”  (The Wretched) 
Directed by: Ahmed Abdel Aziz
 2015 - Guest actress in “ Haret El Yahood” (Jews' Alley)
Directed by: Mohamed Gamal El-Adl
 2016 – Role in “Sabaa Benat” 
Directed by: Mohamed El Nokaly
2017 main woman role in “Lamei Al Qott” 
Directed by: Amr Arafa

She has been on the cover of more than 50 magazines in Egypt, Lebanon, Montenegro, France, Italy and four times on the cover of Elle Middle East and Marrie Claire Arabia, Vogue Arabia & Italy.

Philanthropy
Emad is involved with her own charity organization Help From Your Heart Foundation; she has been a part of the organization since 2013. The project distributes donations to families and children in orphanages in Cairo.

References

External links 
 

1993 births
Living people
21st-century Egyptian actresses
Actresses from Cairo
Egyptian female models
Egyptian television actresses
Montenegrin